Charles George Patrick Shaughnessy, 5th Baron Shaughnessy (born 9 February 1955) is a British actor. He is known for his roles on American television, including Shane Donovan on the soap opera Days of Our Lives, and Maxwell Sheffield on the sitcom The Nanny, and as the voice of Dennis the Goldfish on Stanley for which he won a Daytime Emmy Award. He is also more recently known for his recurring roles as Christopher Plover on The Magicians and St. John Powell on Mad Men. Shaughnessy is currently a series regular on ABC daytime soap opera General Hospital in the role of villain Victor Cassadine; he signed a long-term contract to remain part of the show indefinitely.

Along with his brother, David Shaughnessy, and Ophelia Soumekh, he is a partner in 3S Media Solutions Inc.

Early life
Shaughnessy was born on 9 February 1955 in London, the son of Alfred Shaughnessy, a television writer who was the scriptwriter for Upstairs, Downstairs, and actress Jean Lodge. His brother, David Shaughnessy, is also an actor and a television producer and director. His great-grandfather Thomas Shaughnessy, the 1st Baron Shaughnessy, was an American-Canadian railway administrator of Irish descent. Charles inherited the title when his second cousin Michael (1946–2007), the 4th Baron Shaughnessy, died without issue.

Having been born into a show-business family, Shaughnessy started appearing in plays during primary school. After attending Eton College, he read for a law degree at Magdalene College at the University of Cambridge where he wrote a thesis on the House of Lords.

While at Cambridge, he joined the Footlights club. After graduating, he decided to return to acting and enrolled in a London drama school, which led to his touring in a repertory company. He moved to the United States and married the actress Susan Fallender in 1983, with whom he has two daughters, Jenny (born 1990) and Maddy (born 1995).

Career
Shaughnessy first became widely known for playing Shane Donovan on the soap opera Days of Our Lives from 1984 to 1992. His character's romance with Patsy Pease's character, Kimberly Brady, made the duo into a soap supercouple and revived interest in Days among teenage viewers in the 1980s. In 1986, he appeared with Betty White and Bert Convy on Super Password, and in January 1993, Shaughnessy appeared in an episode of Murphy Brown as the title character's date to the inaugural ball.

Shaughnessy is also well known for his portrayal of Maxwell Sheffield opposite Fran Drescher on CBS's The Nanny from 1993 to 1999. He and Drescher resumed acting together in Drescher's next sitcom, Living with Fran, wherein Shaughnessy appeared fairly frequently as her philandering but needy ex-husband, Ted. Living with Fran was cancelled on 17 May 2006, after two seasons.

In 1996, Shaughnessy reunited with another Days of Our Lives co-star—Charlotte Ross, who portrayed Shane's daughter, Eve Donovan—in the TV movie A Kiss So Deadly. Ross played the roommate of Shaughnessy's daughter (Dedee Pfeiffer); Shaughnessy's character, although married, forms an obsessive, Lolita-esque relationship with Ross. When she tries to break it off, Shaughnessy's character murders Ross's character; gradually, his daughter uncovers the truth.

Shaughnessy appeared (in a dual role) in the Disney Channel 2002 made-for-TV movie Get a Clue. He was also seen in the 2000 made-for-TV Halloween movie Mom's Got a Date with a Vampire starring Caroline Rhea; she guest-starred on The Nanny in 1998 as part of a cross-over with Hollywood Squares. That same year, Shaughnessy made two appearances on The WB's Sabrina (starring Rhea, Melissa Joan Hart, and Beth Broderick), playing two different characters. He played Alec Colson in the 8th-season episode "Covenant" of Stargate SG-1. He also voiced Dr. Quintaine in the PC game Freelancer.

Shaughnessy appeared on an episode of NBC's Law & Order: Special Victims Unit and is also the voice of Dennis the Goldfish on the Disney Channel cartoon series Stanley. On 11 May 2002, Shaughnessy won a Daytime Emmy Award for Outstanding Performer in an Animated Program for his portrayal of Dennis.

On 8 August 2008, Shaughnessy portrayed the murder victim (Samuel, Guru) in Murder 101: The Locked Room Mystery. As of September 2008, his voice was heard in television commercials for Range Rover cars. In December 2008, he provided the voice of Pietro in The Tale of Despereaux. He also portrayed the Cockney English accent for "The Boss" in the game Saints Row 2.

On 5 May 2009, Shaughnessy made a guest appearance in the series The Mentalist episode "Miss Red" as the manager of a private club. He also appeared on the popular TV show Hannah Montana as a talent show judge modeled after Simon Cowell in the episode "Judge Me Tender".

Shaughnessy returned to Days of Our Lives in May 2010, in a storyline associated with the funeral of Alice Horton (played by Frances Reid), briefly reuniting him with his former co-star Patsy Pease (Kimberly). This plot development was necessitated by the real-world death of the actress who had long portrayed Mrs. Horton, as the producers were aware that the audience would not accept the portrayal of the character by anyone else.

In August–September 2010, Shaughnessy appeared as King Arthur in Monty Python's Spamalot! at The Ogunquit Playhouse in Ogunquit, Maine. In January 2011, he won the Broadway World Boston Theater Award for Best Lead Actor in a Musical (Large Theater). Since 2010, Shaughnessy has starred on the soap opera web series The Bay as Elliot Sanders. On 6 December 2010, he reunited with Fran Drescher as a guest on her limited-run daytime show, The Fran Drescher Show.

In June 2011, Shaughnessy appeared as Henry Higgins in My Fair Lady at the North Shore Music Theatre in Beverly, Massachusetts, and returned there to play Georges in La Cage aux Folles in fall 2013 . He made a guest appearance on the first-season finale of Fran Drescher's TV Land sitcom, Happily Divorced, first airing on 17 August 2011.

Shaughnessy returned to Days of Our Lives for a limited run in May 2012 as Shane Donovan, in a storyline involving his return to the ISA and interacting with Hope and Bo Brady and Stefano DiMera.  His co-star Patsy Pease did not appear as Shane's wife, Kimberly, in this story arc; nor did Charlotte Ross, who had played Shane's daughter, Eve. He also returned in November 2013 for a three-episode arc, in which Shane and Kimberly deal with their daughter's drug use.

On 23 January 2014, it was announced that Shaughnessy would assume the lead role in the play Harvey at the New Theatre in Overland Park, Kansas, after original star Judge Reinhold was offered the opportunity to leave the production.

In August 2014, Shaughnessy made a guest appearance on the Disney Channel show Dog with a Blog as business tycoon Tom Fairbanks, a man who wanted to buy Stan, the title character, and use him as the spokes-dog for his animal rescue campaign.

Filmography

Television

Video games

Awards and nominations

Soap Opera Digest Awards
 Won, 1985, for Outstanding New Actor in a Daytime Serials
 Won, 1986, for Favorite Daytime Super Couple on a Daytime Serial (shared with Patsy Pease)
 Won, 1988, for Outstanding Super Couple: Daytime (shared with Patsy Pease)
 Nominated, 1990, for Outstanding Super Couple: Daytime (shared with Patsy Pease)
 Nominated, 1991, for Outstanding Hero: Daytime
 Nominated, 1992, for Outstanding Lead Actor: Daytime

Daytime Emmy Awards
 Won, 2002, for Outstanding Performer in an Animated Program (Stanley)

Broadway World Boston Theater Awards
 Won, 2011, for Best Lead Actor in a Musical (Large Theater)

Arms

See also
 Canadian Hereditary Peers

References

External links
 
 

People educated at Eton College
Alumni of Magdalene College, Cambridge
Shaughnessy, Charles Shaughnessy, 5th Baron
Daytime Emmy Award winners
English people of American descent
English people of Canadian descent
English people of Irish descent
English male film actors
English male soap opera actors
English male video game actors
English male voice actors
Living people
Male actors from London
20th-century English male actors
21st-century English male actors
1955 births